Cymopolia is a genus of green algae in the family Dasycladaceae.

References

External links

Ulvophyceae genera
Dasycladaceae